Donkville is an unincorporated community in Madison County, in the U.S. state of Illinois.

History
A post office was established at Donkville in 1901, and remained in operation until 1907. The community's name honors Emile Donk, the owner of a local mine.

References

Unincorporated communities in Madison County, Illinois
Unincorporated communities in Illinois